The sixth generation of the BMW 7 Series consists of the BMW G11 (normal version) and BMW G12 (long-wheelbase version) luxury saloons. The G11/G12 generation has been produced by BMW since 2015, and is often collectively referred to as the G11.

The G11 was unveiled on 10 June 2015 at BMW's headquarters in Munich.  An official public reveal took place at the 2015 International Motor Show Germany. This generation of the 7 Series is the first car lineup of BMW to be based on the CLAR platform. The CLAR platform adopts technology first introduced in BMW i models, namely the introduction of carbon-fibre-reinforced polymer as structural chassis components. Long-wheelbase cars have the letter "L" in their model name.

As part of BMW's strategy of introducing plug-in hybrid variants for all future car models, the normal and long-wheelbase models were available with hybrid powertrains as 740e and 740Le in 2016.

Development and launch 
The international launch of the new BMW 7 Series was at the 2015 Internationale Automobil-Ausstellung in Frankfurt am Main, Germany. Held in September 2015. The lead exterior designer is Nader Faghihzadeh and Alexey Kezha (facelift).

Production commenced in July 2015 at the Dingolfing manufacturing plant in Germany, with global vehicle sales starting in October 2015.

Design 

The G11 and G12, which are the respective codenames for the short and long wheelbase models, are the first passenger BMW vehicles to be based on the modular BMW CLAR (cluster architecture) platform.

The passenger cell of the 7 Series is made of carbon-fibre-reinforced polymer (CFRP), tensile steel and aluminium, resulting in a lower kerb weight, lower centre of gravity and maintaining a 50/50 axle load distribution. The usage of CFRP allows for weight reduction due to being lighter than steel and aluminium. CFRP also increases structural strength in areas exposed to high steering forces, as it is capable of diverting impact forces to prevent deformations of the material, resulting in higher torsional rigidity. Aluminium has been applied to the doors, boot lid, brake system, wheel hubs and rear suspension arms, further reducing weight and unsprung masses. The G11's body weighs overall  less than that of its predecessor.

The front features a large signature kidney grille incorporating grille shutters that will only open when an increase of air flow to the engine bay is required, decreasing aerodynamic drag in the process. Along with air openings behind the front wheel arches that reduce turbulence in the wheel housings, the drag coefficient has been reduced to 0.24.

The standard self-levelling air suspension of the previous model has been reworked, featuring air springs at both axles with electronically-controlled shock absorbers that can automatically adjust damping according to the environment. The active anti-roll system is optionally available with an electro-hydraulic actuator that improves damper reaction times. For the first time, four-wheel steering, marketed as Integral Active Steering, has also become available for all-wheel drive models.

Equipment

The iDrive operating system for secondary car controls now receives user input from a conventional control wheel, touchscreen, voice commands and is capable of recognizing gestures through a 3D scanner. It is also possible to save a gesture movement with an individual function.

A number of advanced driver assistance systems for the BMW 7 Series have been reworked to work autonomously or partly so—the parking system utilises a number of radar sensors and a stereo camera at the rear, allowing it to execute parking manoeuvres independently and can be operated with a digital key fob. The cruise control driver assist is able to recognize speed limits and will adjust the vehicle's speed accordingly. The lane driving assist warns the driver of possible side or rear collisions. In addition, it is able to detect lane markings and traffic, as well as alter the steering responsiveness to improve driving comfort.

All models can be fitted with M Performance Parts. The parts are a black grille, carbon fibre mirrors, side skirts and sport brakes for facelift models.

Engines
The powertrain line-up consists of a 4.4 litre V8 engine and three engines from BMW's modular B-series engine architecture—two 3.0 litre inline-six engines in petrol and diesel form, as well a 2.0 litre inline-four engine including the hybrid model designated as 740e/740Le, or 730i/730Li for the petrol version. Initially, each model can be equipped with all-wheel drive and is mated to an 8-speed Steptronic ZF automatic transmission. The 750i/750Li, 740i/740Li, 740d/740Ld and 750d/750Ld models are optionally available with the all-wheel drive option xDrive. The transmission can be optionally linked with the satellite navigation system that provides the transmission with geographical data to adjust shift timing in relation to current driving conditions.

The G11 is the first 7 Series generation to feature a plug-in hybrid variant, called the 740e iPerformance. This new model effectively replaces the rather undersold ActiveHybrid 7, which evolved from a 750i based mild hybrid to a 740i based full hybrid in 2014 post-LCI (Life Cycle Impulse) variant. The 740e is marketed as a BMW iPerformance car, not as a member of the BMW i sub-brand.

Special editions

740e/740Le iPerformance

In February 2016, BMW announced the introduction of the "iPerformance" model designation, which was to be given to all BMW plug-in hybrid vehicles from July 2016. The aim is to provide a visible indicator of the transfer of technology from BMW i to the BMW core brand. The new designation will be used first on the plug-in hybrid variants of the latest BMW 7 Series, the BMW 740e iPerformance being the first of such plug-in hybrids.

The 740e iPerformance was unveiled at the 2016 Geneva International Motor Show, together with the new BMW M760Li xDrive and the BMW i8 Protonic Red Edition special-edition model. Sales of the 740e iPerformance began in Germany in July 2016.

BMW's Auto eDrive function allows drivers to choose how the car operates and features modes for pure electric driving and performance. Drivers can also select from the usual Eco Pro, Comfort and Sport modes too. The 740e can be charged in less than four hours from a domestic socket, or in under three hours from a wall charger. All models get an eight-speed automatic transmission as standard.

The 740e is available in both standard and long-wheelbase forms, and also as an all-wheel drive xDrive variant.

Alpina B7 

The Alpina B7 xDrive was announced by BMW North America in February 2016 with sales starting in September.

The Alpina B7 features a  4.4 litre twin-turbocharged V8 engine delivering  of torque and a more luxurious interior. It was unveiled at the 2016 Geneva Motor Show.

The facelift model was unveiled on 11 February 2019. Acceleration from 0– is achieved in 3.6 seconds while the  top speed is now unlimited worldwide. Public introduction took place at the 2019 Geneva Motor Show and deliveries began during July.

M760Li xDrive 

The M760Li xDrive is the top trim of the 7 Series. It was unveiled in February 2016 and made its official public debut at the 2016 Geneva Motor Show. As the first 7 Series to be an M Performance model, the M760Li receives technical upgrades over the standard 7 Series as standard equipment, including M Performance-specific tuning of the transmission's shift programmes,  M Sport brakes, an M Sport exhaust system, performance tyres and standard fit Integral Active Steering. It is also the first V12-powered BMW model ever made to feature xDrive as standard, breaking the trend of the previous V12-engined BMWs which were only rear-wheel drive. 

The M760Li features several visual cues to differentiate it from base 7 Series models. These include a  alloy wheel design exclusive to the M760Li. Several pieces of exterior trim are finished in "Cerium Grey", most notably the mirror caps, side "Air Breathers" and the tailpipe embellishers. There are V12 badges on the C-pillars, and a unique tailpipe design at the rear.

The M760Li can also be specified as an "Excellence" top of the range model. This receives modifications to the exterior and interior which create a luxurious appearance, compared to the sporty aesthetics of the standard M760Li.

Final V12 
On 18 January 2022, BMW announced a new limited edition M760Li xDrive simply called "The Final V12." As the name suggests, it will be the last BMW series production vehicle to be fitted with a V-12 engine. Built exclusively for the United States, just 12 examples will be sold to the public. BMW plans to approach previous buyers with a history of V-12 BMW ownership with an invitation to purchase the Final V12.

Facelift

The updated 7 Series models were unveiled on 16 January 2019 as 2020 model year cars. Notable changes of the facelift include a larger kidney grille shared with the X7 (40 percent larger than the outgoing model) and sleeker headlights with optional laser headlights. The V8 models and the hybrid models were updated and a new hands-free driving system which operates under certain conditions was added to the range.

The new front is accompanied by a more prominent front fascia and a power dome on the bonnet. The rear of the car now has LED tail lamps joined by a central stripe and a new rear bumper. Other exterior changes include new optional  wheels.

Updates to the interior include a new  instrument cluster and a  infotainment screen. A new voice assistant is also added to the infotainment system along with the BMW iDrive system 7.0 with updated graphics and menus. The main technological feature is the Extended Traffic Jam Assistant which allows the driver to leave the steering wheel at speeds up to  during urban city driving. The system manages steering, acceleration and braking of the car and cameras ensure that the driver pays attention on the road.

The rear-wheel-drive option for the 750i/750Li was discontinued, making the 740i/740Li the only model to be available with optional rear-wheel-drive.

The 740e/740Le hybrid model was discontinued in favour of the updated 745e/745Le iPerformance. The 745e/745Le iPerformance uses a turbocharged inline-6 engine shared with the X5 xDrive45e. A new 12 kW⋅h battery pack is employed for the electric motors to increase the electric range.

The updated 7 Series models went on sale in April 2019.

In Malaysia, the facelift 7 series 745Le is known as 740Le.

In Thailand, the 730Ld, 745Le xDrive, and M760Li xDrive are offered.

Production 
The G11 is produced at the BMW Group Plant Dingolfing in Germany. Complete knock-down (CKD) assembly is conducted in Jakarta, Indonesia and at the BMW Thailand plant in Rayong. It is also produced in India at BMW Group Plant, Chennai.

Reception 
The 2016 7-series was named one of the top ten tech cars in 2016 by IEEE Spectrum.

References

External links 
 

2020s cars
All-wheel-drive vehicles
G11
7 Series (G11)
Cars introduced in 2015
Full-size vehicles
Limousines
Plug-in hybrid vehicles
Rear-wheel-drive vehicles